The 2010–11 Belgian Hockey League season was the 91st season of the Belgian Hockey League, the top level of ice hockey in Belgium. Two teams, HYC Herentals and the White Caps Turnhout, participated in a seven-game series for the championship. The teams also participated in the multi-national North Sea Cup.

Final
 HYC Herentals - White Caps Turnhout 2:4 (3:4 OT, 5:3, 3:1, 5:6 OT, 2:6, 2:6)

References
Season on hockeyarchives.info

Belgian Hockey League
Belgian Hockey League seasons
Bel